Clytini is a tribe of beetles in the subfamily Cerambycinae, containing the following genera:

 Abacoclytus Pesarini & Sabbadini, 1997
 Acrocyrta Pascoe, 1856
 Amamiclytus K. Ohbayashi, 1964
 Amyipunga Martins & Galileo, 2011
 Anthoboscus Chevrolat, 1860
 Ayriclytus Martins & Galileo, 2011
 Brachyclytus Kraatz, 1879
 Calanthemis Thomson, 1864
 Calloides LeConte, 1873
 Carinoclytus Aurivillius, 1912
 Cetimaju Galileo & Martins, 2007
 Chlorophorus Chevrolat, 1863
 Clytobius Gressitt, 1951
 Clytocera Gahan, 1906
 Clytoleptus Casey, 1912
 Clytopsis Casey, 1912
 Clytosaurus Thomson, 1864
 Clytus Laicharting, 1784
 Cotyclytus Martins & Galileo, 2011
 Cyrtoclytus Ganglbauer, 1881
 Demonax Thomson, 1860
 Denticerus Jordan, 1894
 Dexithea Thomson, 1864
 Epiclytus Gressitt, 1935
 Euryscelis Dejean, 1835
 Glycobius LeConte, 1873
 Hesperoclytus Holzschuh, 1986
 Ischnodora Chevrolat, 1863
 Isotomus Mulsant, 1863
 Itaclytus Martins & Galileo, 2011
 Kazuoclytus Hayashi, 1968
 Laodemonax Gressitt & Rondon, 1972
 Mecometopus Thomson, 1860
 Megacheuma Mickel, 1919
 Megacyllene Casey, 1912
 Miriclytus Martins & Galileo, 2011
 Neoclytus Thomson, 1860
 Ochraethes Chevrolat, 1860
 Perissus Chevrolat, 1863
 Pirangoclytus Martins & Galileo, 2011
 Placoclytus Chemsak & Linsley, 1974
 Placosternus Hopping, 1937
 Plagionotulus Jordan, 1894
 Plagionotus Mulsant, 1842
 Plagithmysus Motschulsky, 1845
 Plesioclytus Giesbert, 1993
 Pseudosphegesthes Reitter, 1912
 Psilomerus Chevrolat, 1863
 Rhabdoclytus Ganglbauer, 1889
 Rhaphuma Pascoe, 1858
 Rostroclytus Martins & Galileo, 2011
 Sarosesthes Thomson, 1864
 Sinoclytus Holzschuh, 1995
 Tanyochraethes Chemsak & Linsley, 1965
 Teratoclytus Zaitzev, 1937
 Thranodes Pascoe, 1869
 Trichoxys Chevrolat, 1860
 Triodoclytus Casey, 1913
 Tylcus Casey, 1912
 Unaiuba Martins & Galileo, 2011
 Xylotrechus Chevrolat, 1860
 Ygapema Martins & Galileo, 2011

References

 
Cerambycinae
Beetle tribes